Trondhjems SK may refer to:
Trondhjems SK (skating)
Trondhjems SK (skiing)